Tim Mead (born 1981) is an English countertenor.

Life and career
Tim Mead was born in Chelmsford, Essex and began singing as a treble in the choir of Chelmsford Cathedral. He was educated at King Edward VI Grammar School, Chelmsford and the Junior Department of Trinity College of Music where he studied cello and piano. He was an undergraduate at King's College, Cambridge, where he was a choral scholar studying musicology. After graduating, he won a number of scholarships for post-graduate studies at the Royal College of Music where he studied with Robin Blaze.

Mead has performed with many leading interpreters including conductors Howard Arman, Harry Bicket, Ivor Bolton, William Christie, Stephen Cleobury, Marcus Creed, Laurence Cummings, Christian Curnyn, Alan Curtis, Ottavio Dantone, Paul Goodwin, Emmanuelle Haïm, Thomas Hengelbrock, Vladimir Jurowski, Raymond Leppard, Nicholas Kraemer, Alessandro de Marchi, Nicholas McGegan, Marc Minkowski, James O'Donnell, Antonio Pappano, Hans-Christoph Rademann, Andreas Spering, Masaaki Suzuki and Jos van Veldhoven. He has collaborated with opera directors including David Alden, Robert Carsen, Doris Dörrie, Stephen Langridge, David McVicar, Katie Mitchell, Ole Anders Tandberg, Deborah Warner and Chen Shi-Zheng.

He has appeared with ensembles including Orchestra of the Age of Enlightenment, the Academy of Ancient Music, The English Concert, Les Arts Florissants, Le Concert d'Astrée, Les Musiciens du Louvre, Concerto Köln, Akademie für Alte Musik Berlin, Balthasar-Neumann-Ensemble, Accademia Bizantina, Bach Collegium Japan, the Netherlands Bach Society, Combattimento Consort Amsterdam, and the RIAS Kammerchor.

In September 2016 Mead sang in Bach's Mass in B minor as part of The BBC Proms.

Mead is a founding member of The Prince Consort. The consort have recorded works by Ned Rorem, Brahms and Stephen Hough.

Opera roles
Mead's opera roles to date have included:
 Boy/Angel 1 in George Benjamin's "Written on Skin" (Theatre du Capitole, Mostly Mozart Festival and Bolshoi Theatre )
 Endimione in Francesco Cavalli's La Calisto (Bayerische Staatsoper, Teatro Real, Madrid)
 Paggio in Cavalli's Ercole amante (De Nederlandse Opera)
 Arsamene in Cavalli's Il Xerse (Opera de Lille, Théâtre de Caen, Theater an der Wien)
 Innocent in Harrison Birtwistle's The Minotaur (Royal Opera, London)
 Oberon in Benjamin Britten's "A Midsummer Night's Dream" (Bergen National Opera and Glyndebourne Festival Opera)
 Voice of Apollo in Benjamin Britten's "Death in Venice" (English National Opera and Dutch National Opera)
 Ometh in John Casken's Golem (Opera de Rennes and Angers-Nantes Opéra)
 Ulisse in Corselli's Achille in Sciro (Teatro Real, Madrid)
Orfeo in Gluck's Orfeo ed Euridice (Akademie für Alte Musik Berlin)
 Admeto in Handel's Admeto (Göttingen International Handel Festival and Edinburgh International Festival)
 Amadigi in Handel's Amadigi (Early Opera Company)
Dardano in Handel's Amadigi (Garsington Opera)
Trasimede in Handel's Admeto (Handel Festival, Halle)
 Ottone in Handel's Agrippina (Opéra de Lille, Opéra de Dijon and Vlaamse Opera)
 Ezio in Handel's Ezio (London Handel Festival)
 Flavio in Handel's Flavio (Early Opera Company)
 Cesare in Handel's Giulio Cesare (Glyndebourne Festival Opera)
 Tolomeo in Handel's Giulio Cesare (Deutsche Oper am Rhein and English National Opera)
 Idelberto in Handel's Lotario (Kammerorchester Basel)
 Hamor in Handel's Jeptha (Opéra National de Paris)
 Orlando in Handel's Orlando (Scottish Opera and Chicago Opera Theater)
 Riccardo in Handel's Riccardo Primo (Opera Theatre of St. Louis)
 Oronte in Handel's Riccardo Primo (Kammerorchester Basel)
 Rinaldo in Handel's Rinaldo (Bach Collegium Japan)
 Goffredo in Handel's Rinaldo (Glyndebourne Festival Opera)
 Eustazio in Handel's Rinaldo (Glyndebourne Festival Opera)
 Bertarido in Handel's Rodelinda (English National Opera and Mercury Baroque, Houston)
 David in Handel's Saul (Opera North)
 Athamas in Handel's Semele (British Youth Opera)
 Siroe in Handel's Siroe (Oper der Zeit)
 Melo in Handel's Sosarme (London Handel Festival)
 Shepherd in Monteverdi's L'Orfeo (English National Opera and Handel and Haydn Society, Boston)
 Ottone in Monteverdi's L'incoronazione di Poppea (Opéra National de Lyon, English National Opera, Norwegian National Opera and Ballet, Opéra de Lille and Opéra de Dijon)
 Apollo in Mozart's Apollo et Hyacinthus (Classical Opera Company)
 Farnace in Mozart's Mitridate (Classical Opera Company)
 Jalal in Julian Philips Varjak Paw (The Opera Group)
 Clearte in Agostino Steffani's Niobe (Royal Opera, London and Grand Théâtre de Luxembourg)
 Licida in Vivaldi's L'Olimpiade (Garsington Opera)
 Akhnaten in Philip Glass's Akhnaten (Vlaamse Opera)

Recordings
Mead has a wide-ranging and growing discography including the Gramophone Award nominated recordings of Handel's Flavio with the Early Opera Company under Christian Curnyn (Chandos, 2010), Bach's B minor Mass with Arcangelo under Jonathan Cohen (Hyperion, 2014) and a DVD of Britten's Death in Venice with English National Opera under Edward Gardner, directed by Deborah Warner (Opus Arte, 2014). He is featured on two recordings as a treble chorister soloist.

References

External links
 Official website
 Intermusica Artists' Management Ltd.
 I must be mad to play Orlando (Glasgow Evening News 16/2/11)
 Boy Soloist
 St Matthew Passion on All of Bach, featuring Tim Mead as the alto soloist
Tim Mead's London Concert List

1981 births
Alumni of King's College, Cambridge
Alumni of the Royal College of Music
21st-century British male opera singers
British performers of early music
Living people
Operatic countertenors
People educated at King Edward VI Grammar School, Chelmsford
Choral Scholars of the Choir of King's College, Cambridge